Tol Tol is a locality in Victoria, Australia, located approximately 8 km from Robinvale.

A Tol Tol Post Office was open between 1924 and 1926 before being replaced by Bannerton.

References

Towns in Victoria (Australia)
Rural City of Swan Hill